Kari Sallinen (born September 24, 1959) is a Finnish orienteering competitor. He was the first Finn who won the Individual World Orienteering Championships. The competition was held in the year 1985 in Bendigo, Australia. He was also part of the Finnish team that obtained bronze in the 1981 Relay World Championship in Thun, Switzerland.

His mother is Raili Sallinen.

See also
 Finnish orienteers
 List of orienteers
 List of orienteering events

References

1959 births
Living people
Finnish orienteers
Male orienteers
Foot orienteers
World Orienteering Championships medalists